Klavže is a settlement in the Bača Valley in the Municipality of Tolmin in the Littoral region of Slovenia.

Name
Klavže was attested in written sources in 1763–87 as Klausa. The name is derived from the Slovene common noun klavže 'logging sluice' (< German Klause < Middle High German klûse < Medieval Latin clūsa 'barrier'), referring to logging activity in the area.

Infrastructure

The Bohinj Railway line runs through the settlement. The Podmelec Hydroelectric Plant was built at Klavže in 1931 by Luigi Corvi.

References

External links 

Klavže on Geopedia

Populated places in the Municipality of Tolmin